is a railway station on the Ainokaze Toyama Railway Line in Imizu, Toyama, Japan, operated by the third-sector railway operator Ainokaze Toyama Railway.

Lines

Station layout 
Kosugi Station has one side platform and one island platform connected by a footbridge. The station is staffed.

Platforms

History
The station opened on 20 March 1899. With the privatization of JNR on 1 April 1987, the station came under the control of JR West.

From this date, Kosugi Station was transferred to the ownership of the third-sector operating company Ainokaze Toyama Railway.

Adjacent stations

Passenger statistics
In fiscal 2015, the station was used by an average of 3,064 passengers daily (boarding passengers only).

Surrounding area 
 Imizu City Hall
 Toyama Prefectural University
Toyama College of Business and Information Technology

See also
 List of railway stations in Japan

References

External links

  

Railway stations in Toyama Prefecture
Railway stations in Japan opened in 1899
Ainokaze Toyama Railway Line
Imizu, Toyama